The Percival David Foundation of Chinese Art (abbreviated as the PDF) holds a collection of Chinese ceramics and related items assembled by Percival David that are on permanent display in a dedicated gallery in Room 95 at the British Museum. The Foundation's main purpose is to promote the study and teaching of Chinese art and culture. The collection consists of some 1,700 pieces, mostly of Song, Yuan, Ming and Qing dynasty porcelain from the 10th century to the 18th. It includes a painting, Scroll of Antiquities (1728, Yongzheng's reign).

The collection concentrates on pieces in the "Chinese taste" rather than export wares, and on Imperial porcelain, much of it Jingdezhen ware.  It includes examples of the rare Ru and Guan wares and two important Yuan dynasty blue and white porcelain temple vases (the "David Vases"), the oldest dated blue and white porcelain pieces, from 1351.  The Foundation also has a large library of Western and East Asian books related to Chinese art; this and archival material are housed in the library of School of Oriental and African Studies (SOAS), University of London.

In 1950, the Collection was presented to the University of London by Sir Percival David. His collection was displayed in a house in Gordon Square and used as a focus for the teaching of Chinese art and culture at SOAS. The collection has been on display in a special room at the British Museum since 2009.

History

Percival David started collecting Chinese art some time around 1913, and he continued to do so until his death in 1964. He first visited China in 1923, and there he gained an appreciation of Chinese ceramics. In 1925 he helped finance and mount an exhibition of many of the best items of the imperial collection in the Forbidden City in Beijing. In 1927, he acquired some items that were originally from the Forbidden City when they came onto the market. Many of these items were sold off by members of the Imperial Household Department during the late Qing dynasty, and Empress Dowager Cixi allegedly used these items as collateral for loans from the Yuin Yeh Bank in 1901. David managed to buy some forty pieces one way or the other and export them to the United Kingdom. In 1930, he again returned to China and helped with various exhibitions and produced a series of catalogues of the pieces. However, much of the acquisition history of David's collection was unrecorded, but he may have acquired many of the items through various dealers, auctions and other collectors. The Yuan dynasty 'David Vases' in the collection were acquired from two separate sources. Many pieces were likely once owned by the Qing dynasty emperors, and several pieces have inscriptions added by the orders of the Qianlong Emperor (1736–95).  The pieces assembled by Percival David form the most important single collection of Chinese ceramics outside of China and Taiwan.

In 1931, David's collection was displayed in the Dorchester Hotel in London. It remained there until it was evacuated to the countryside during World War II. David also created a Chair in Chinese Art and Architecture at the Courtauld Institute of Art, which is part of the University of London. Towards the end of his life, he was determined to keep the collection together, and to this end entered negotiations with the University of London. An agreement was reached to keep the collection and the library together in a foundation attached to SOAS.

The chair that David had created was also moved to SOAS. Previous holders of the chair, called the Percival David Professor of Chinese and East Asian Art, include William Watson, Roderick Whitfield and Craig Clunas. The current incumbent is Shane McCausland. The collection was opened to the public on 10 June 1952 in a house in Gordon Square, Bloomsbury.

The Foundation has lent many of its pieces to other countries. It lent many items of Yuan dynasty porcelain to Venice's 700th-anniversary celebration of Marco Polo's expedition. It has also sent other items to places as far away as Japan and the United States.

The Library collection was a working library, open to researchers from around the world.

Relocation

Due to a funding crisis, the Gordon Square building housing the Foundation's collection closed at the end of 2007. The ceramics collection has been loaned on a long-term basis to the British Museum, where the whole collection, about 1,700 objects, is on permanent public display in a specially designed new gallery (Room 95, British Museum) opened on 23 April 2009, sponsored by Sir Joseph Hotung. The public gallery is part of the Sir Joseph Hotung Centre for Ceramic Studies, which includes facilities to use the collection for teaching.

Chinese Ceramics: Highlights of the Sir Percival David Collection, by Regina Krahl and Jessica Harrison-Hall, was published in April 2009 by the British Museum Press to coincide with the opening of the new display.

Collection
David focused his collection of Chinese ceramics on stonewares and porcelain from the 10th to the 18th centuries (Song to Qing dynasties), with a few earlier pieces from the Six Dynasties to the Tang. The earliest piece in the collection dates from the third-century Western Jin. There are no pieces from the earlier periods of Chinese history because David chose not to collect any Chinese earthenware; the development of earthenware is found all around the world, and David's collection aims to give a representative overview of the development of ceramics that is unique to China. He chose the pieces based on the quality of the workmanship and historical importance with a view towards education. Many pieces were imperial wares of the Ming and Qing dynasty, and he collected an unusual number of the rare Song dynasty Ru ware. Just before the opening of the collection in 1952, the foundation was also given a small collection of mostly monochrome porcelain belonging to Mountstuart Elphinstone.

At the British museum, the collection of the 1,700 items starts with the David Vases placed before the main space of Room 95. Around two hundred of the best pieces are displayed in cases in the centre of the room, with the remaining 1,500 pieces arranged more compactly in rows of glass shelves around the room.

References

External links 

 British Museum, Room 95 including a Google virtual tour
 BBC audio file A History of the World in 100 Objects
 Illustrated catalogue of Ch'ing enamelled wares in the Percival David Foundation of Chinese Art from SOAS University of London
 A Handbook of Chinese Ceramics from the Metropolitan Museum of Art

1952 establishments in the United Kingdom
Chinese pottery
SOAS University of London
Former private collections in the United Kingdom
Percival David Foundation of Chinese Art
Arts foundations based in the United Kingdom
Chinese porcelain